The 1903–04 season is the 30th season of competitive football by Rangers.

Overview
Rangers played a total of 31 competitive matches during the 1903–04 season. The club finished fourth in Scottish League Division One, five points behind champions Third Lanark. Rangers was equal on points with third placed Celtic and a point behind second placed Hearts.

The Scottish Cup campaign ended in a 3–2 cup final defeat to the club's Old Firm rivals. A Finlay Speedie brace was not enough to win them the cup.

Results
All results are written with Rangers' score first.

Scottish League Division One

Scottish Cup

Appearances

See also
 1903–04 in Scottish football
 1903–04 Scottish Cup

Rangers F.C. seasons
Rangers